Prince George—Bulkley Valley was a federal electoral district in British Columbia, Canada, that was represented in the House of Commons of Canada from 1979 to 2004.

Geography 
This was a large, rural riding in northern B.C.

History 
This electoral district was created in 1976 from parts of Prince George—Peace River, Skeena and Kamloops—Cariboo ridings.

This district was abolished in 2003. Parts of it went to Cariboo—Prince George, Skeena—Bulkley Valley, Prince George—Peace River and Kamloops–Thompson ridings.

Members of Parliament 

This riding elected the following Members of Parliament:

Election results

See also 

 List of Canadian federal electoral districts
 Past Canadian electoral districts

External links 
 Library of Parliament Riding Profile
 Expenditures – 2000
 Expenditures – 1997
 Website of the Parliament of Canada

Former federal electoral districts of British Columbia